The Centre for Research in the Arts, Social Sciences and Humanities (CRASSH) is an interdisciplinary research centre within the University of Cambridge. Founded in 2001, CRASSH came into being as a way to create interdisciplinary dialogue across the University’s many faculties and departments in the arts, social sciences, and humanities, as well as to build bridges with scientific subjects. It has now grown into one of the largest humanities institutes in the world and is a major presence in academic life in the UK. It serves at once to draw together disciplinary perspectives in Cambridge and to disseminate new ideas to audiences across Europe and beyond.

CRASSH’s mission is to create new resources for thought, stimulate interdisciplinary research and disciplinary innovation, establish new intellectual networks and affiliations, respond to emerging social and political challenges, engage new publics in humanities research and help to shape public policy. Its programmes include visiting fellowships, early career fellowships for Cambridge academics, and a variety of interdisciplinary research networks, alongside a conference programme designed to forge new connections and open up fresh intellectual pathways. CRASSH’s research community includes many postdoctoral researchers working on its diverse range of interdisciplinary projects, which often involve international collaborations, and are funded by research councils, charities, trusts, and philanthropic donations.

Directors
 Ian Donaldson, 2001–3
 Ludmilla Jordanova, 2003–5
 Mary Jacobus, 2005–11
 Andrew Webber (Sabbatical Director), 2009–10
 Simon Goldhill, 2011–18
 Steven Connor, 2018–

Management committee 2022
Chair: Tim Lewens (Professor of Philosophy of Science and Head of Department, Department of History and Philosophy of Science)
Tim Harper (Chair, School of Humanities and Social Sciences)
Chris Young (Chair, School of Arts and Humanities)
Steven Connor FBA (Grace 2 Professor of English; Director, CRASSH)
Caroline Bassett (Professor, Director, Cambridge Digital Humanities)
Sriya Iyer (Professor of Economics, Faculty of Economics)
Louise Haywood (Professor in Medieval Iberian Literary and Cultural Studies, Faculty of Modern and Medieval Languages and Linguistics)
David Howarth (Professor of Law and Public Policy, Land Economy)
William Janeway (Faculty of Economics)
Bridget Kendall (Master of Peterhouse)
Carrie Vout (Professor of Classics & Director of the Museum of Classical Archaeology)

Research projects
CRASSH is and was home to numerous major, long-term research projects and centres.

 Minderoo Centre for Technology and Democracy
 Minderoo Centre is primarily funded by Minderoo Foundation which is primarily funded by Andrew Forrest, Chairman of Fortescue Metals Group
 Cambridge Digital Humanities
 Centre for Global Knowledge Studies
 Centre for the Humanities and Social Change, Cambridge
 Centre for the Study of Existential Risk(now a spin-off centre)
 Beyond the Cold War: Toward a Community of Asia
 Crossroads of Knowledge in Early Modern England: The Place of Literature
 Expertise Under Pressure 
 Genius Before Romanticism: Ingenuity in Early Modern Art and Science
 Giving Voice to Digital Democracies: The Social Impact of Artificially Intelligent Communications Technology
 The Global as ARTEFACT: Understanding the Patterns of Global Political History Through an Anthropology of Knowledge – The Case of Agriculture in Four Global Systems from the Neolithic to the Present
 Making Visible: The Visual and Graphic Practices of the Early Royal Society
 Qualitative and Quantitative Social Science: Unifying the Logic of Causal Inference?
 Religious Diversity and the Secular University
 Bible and Antiquity in 19th Century Culture
 China in a Global World War II
 The Concept Lab
 Conspiracy and Democracy
 Conversions
 The History of Cross-Cultural Comparatism
 Limits of the Numerical
 Seeing Things: Early Modern Visual and Material Culture
 Technology and Democracy
 Visual Representations of the Third Plague Pandemic

Research networks
The CRASSH Research Networks Programme supports groups of Cambridge graduate students and faculty members working together with a common interdisciplinary research interest, bringing together early-career researchers, established academics and guest speakers on particular research topics for a year of collaborative work.

Conferences
The CRASSH Conference Programme] showcases arts, social sciences and humanities research in action. It enables Cambridge scholars to convene events designed to look beyond disciplinary boundaries and broker exciting collaborations with academics and practitioners from across the world.

Fellowships

CRASSH offers a number of Fellowship Programmes to bring scholars from all over the world to Cambridge. These schemes allow a community of scholars–from postdoctoral and early career researchers to more established visiting fellows–to interact in an interdisciplinary research environment.

Alison Richard Building
At the beginning of 2012, CRASSH moved into the new Alison Richard Building at the West Road gateway to the University’s Sidgwick Site, the main base for humanities and social science teaching and research at Cambridge. The building was designed by Nicholas Hare Architects and received a commendation at the 2013 Civic Trust Awards. The Centre’s relocation put CRASSH alongside the major regional studies centres as well as the Department of Politics and International Studies. The building is also home to Edmund de Waal's first piece of public sculpture, A Local History, a commission of three vitrines filled with porcelain and sunk into the pavement outside the building.

See also
University of Cambridge

References

External links
  

Culture of the University of Cambridge
History of literature
Educational projects
Research projects
Arts, Social Sciences and Humanities, Centre for
Research institutes in Cambridge
Social science institutes
Research institutes established in 2001
2001 establishments in England